Judith and Her Maidservant or Judith and Her Maidservant with the Head of Holofernes is a circa 1510–1514 oil on panel painting by Correggio, now in the Musée des Beaux-Arts of Strasbourg, France. Its inventory number is 252.

Details such as Judith's hairstyle date the work to Correggio's early period. Its subject matter was often painted by Correggio's master Mantegna, whilst its chiaroscuro effect laid the foundations for the noted "nocturnes" by Caravaggio.

Its first definite appearance in the historical record dates to 1892, when Wilhelm von Bode bought it for its present owner. It was soon attributed to Correggio. There is a reference to a "half-length" Judith "in mock-night" in a Gonzaga inventory of 1627 which may be identifiable with the work, as may a number of mentions of a Correggio "Herodias", possibly a mistake for Judith in the c.1510 work.

References

External links 
Judith et la servante , presentation of the painting on the museum's website

Paintings by Correggio
Correggio
Paintings in the collection of the Musée des Beaux-Arts de Strasbourg
Gonzaga art collection
1510 paintings
Oil paintings